Thomas Kershaw (1819–1898) was a leading British pioneer of marbleizing, the creation of imitation marble finishes.

He was born in Standish, Lancashire and from the age of 12 served his time as an apprentice to John Platt, a Bolton painter and decorator. During this time he bought graining tools with money earned from painting pictures and developed his skills in the art of wood graining. On completion of his apprenticeship he moved firstly to Manchester, then York and finally in 1845 to London. There he was employed by William Cubitt and Company, becoming their leading wood grainer.

In the mid-1840s he left Cubitts to be independent and exhibited his imitation marble panels at the Great Exhibition of 1851, which won him a prize. At the Paris Exposition Universelle of 1855 he won a gold medal, but felt obliged to carry out public demonstrations of his craft in the exhibition hall after accusations that he was using some type of fraudulent transfer technique. On his return he bought a house in Baker Street and set up his own specialist decorating company.

He was given several lucrative contracts, including one from the Royal family to marbleise the columns at Buckingham Palace and Osborne House, but turned down a request from the Russian Ambassador to marbleise the interior of the Imperial Palace in St Petersburg. In 1862 he won another gold medal at the London Exhibition and was elected a liveryman in the Painter-Stainers Company for thirty-eight years. In 1860 he was granted the Freedom of the City of London.

He died a rich man in 1898. He had married in 1857 and had a daughter.

Work
Emperor's Room, Buckingham Palace (1858)
Baron de Rothchild's mansion
Great Western Hotel, Paddington, London
Dorchester House, Park Lane, London (demolished, 1929)
Manley Hall, Manchester (demolished, 1905)

Examples of his work are on show in Bolton Museum and the Victoria and Albert Museum.

External links

  A set of five faux-marble painted panels by Thomas Kershaw in the Victoria and Albert Museum
Thomas Kershaw Society

References

 A History of the British Decorators' Association, page 9
 Thomas Kershaw 1819-1898 "Prince of Grainers & Marblers" A Brief history & tribute to his life & works by Stewart Mc Donald. 2004
 The Prince of Grainers and Marblers

1819 births
1898 deaths
People from Standish, Greater Manchester
Faux painting
Decorative arts
Surface decorative techniques in woodworking